Endangered Species: A Compilation Of Rare And Obscure Tracks is a 2000 compilation album by British singer-songwriter Des'ree. As suggested by its title, it is not a greatest hits compilation, but a collection of assorted b-side only tracks, songs from soundtracks, and live versions of her hits from her first three albums.

The selection features five b-sides from her different singles (with "Warm Hands, Cold Heart", a b-side to "You Gotta Be" being a new mix specially done for the compilation), five live songs, an acoustic mix, the song "Silent Hero" which was recorded for the 1995 film Clockers, and one then-unreleased song, "Soul Mates".

It is Des'ree's only compilation to date. Des'ree was taking time off from music at the time to focus on her private life and the making of her fourth album Dream Soldier and therefore did not promote the album, which did not chart.

Track listing 

 "Silent Hero" 5:04
 "Get A Life" 3:31
 "I Ain't Movin' (Family Stand Acoustic Mix)" 4:06
 "Innocent & Naive" 3:41
 "Warm Hands, Cold Heart (2000 Mix)" 4:39
 "I Ain't Movin' (Live)" 5:20
 "Little Child (Live)" 3:52
 "Looking Philosophical" 4:11
 "Caring World" 4:13
 "Soul Mates" 3:53
 "Feel So High (Live In London)" 4:50
 "You Gotta Be (Live In London)" 5:13
 "Life (Live In London)" 6:04

Des'ree albums
2000 compilation albums
Epic Records compilation albums